The Karni Crossing was a cargo terminal on the Israel-Gaza Strip barrier located in the north-eastern end of the Gaza Strip that existed between 1994 and 2011 and used for the export and import of goods from/to the Gaza Strip. This was done as a 'back-to-back' transfer, meaning that Palestinian products meant for export were removed from a Palestinian truck and placed in an Israeli truck, and vice versa for incoming goods. The Karni Crossing was also used by the residents of Netzarim since the Karni road was the only route to that isolated Israeli settlement on which Jewish travel was allowed after the 1994 implementation of the Oslo Accords. The crossing has been affected by the Israeli Blockade of the Gaza Strip. 

At the end of March 2011 Israel permanently closed the Karni Crossing. Ten years later, in 2022, the last remaining structures of the crossing were demolished by the Israeli military.

According to the management, the crossing was named after Joseph Karni, an Israeli who had set up a modern packing warehouse in the Gaza Strip near the present-day cargo terminal shortly after Israel captured the strip in 1967. The Palestinians called it Al-Montar, after the nearby Ali Montar hill.

History 
The Karni Crossing was opened in 1994 after the signing of the Oslo Accords to allow Palestinian merchants to export and import goods.

The Karni Crossing has been attacked several times by Palestinian militants since the beginning of the Second Intifada in 2000, in either mortar attacks or frontal infantry assaults, forcing temporary shut-downs for repairs and enhancement of security procedures. Both Palestinians and Israelis have been killed in these attacks. As a crossing between Israel and the Gaza Strip, the Karni Crossing has been used for hostile activities by armed forces from the Palestinian side. Militant Palestinian factions have used the Karni Crossing to smuggle suicide bombers and explosive belts into Israel. The deadliest suicide attack to come via Karni was the Port of Ashdod bombing in 2004.

In 2006, the Israeli authorities closed the crossing for over 100 days due to terror alerts and rocket fire. By then, the Karni Crossing was managed by the Israel Airports Authority, unlike the Erez Crossing, which is managed by the Israel Defense Forces.

Between September 2006 and June 2007, the crossing was open daily except for several brief closures due to Palestinian labour strikes. When Hamas took over the Gaza Strip in June 2007, Israel closed the terminal. The previous operators, who were affiliated with Fatah, had fled to the West Bank. Hamas has offered to bring Fatah back to Karni or hire a Turkish company to operate the Palestinian side, but Israel has refused to deal with Hamas, the de facto authority in the Gaza Strip. In June 2007, the UNWRA coordinator commended the IDF on moving humanitarian shipments to the secondary Kerem Shalom and Sufa crossings, and hoped that Karni could be reopened as part of a longer-term solution.

At the end of March 2011, Israel permanently shut the Karni Crossing.

In December 2022, the last remaining structures of the previous Karni Crossing were demolished by the Israeli military, more than a decade after the crossining was closed.

See also 
 Karni border crossing attack

References

External links

Transport infrastructure completed in 1994
Israel–Gaza Strip border crossings
Gaza–Israel conflict
1994 establishments in the Palestinian territories
1994 establishments in Israel